Degrees of Certainty may refer to:

Rudolf Carnap
Bayesian analysis
Confidence Interval